Texas's 34th congressional district is a district that was created as a result of the 2010 Census. The first candidates ran in the 2012 elections; the winner, Democrat Filemon Vela Jr., was seated for the 113th United States Congress. The district is currently represented by Vicente Gonzalez (D-McAllen), who was redistricted there from Texas's 15th congressional district.

Texas's 34th congressional district is composed of the area on the Gulf Coast between Brownsville and Corpus Christi, the latter of which being situated in the neighbouring 27th congressional district, with a portion turning inland into the rural portions of the state. In addition to the City of Brownsville, other major towns in the district include Alice, Beeville, Harlingen, Kingsville and San Benito.

Statewide election results 

 Results Under Current Lines (Since 2023)

List of members representing the district

Recent election results

References

External links

34
Constituencies established in 2013
2013 establishments in Texas